Bindoy (formerly Payabon), officially the Municipality of Bindoy, is a 3rd class municipality in the province of Negros Oriental, Philippines. According to the 2020 census, it has a population of 40,308 people.

History
Negros Oriental's lone municipality named after a native of distinction, Bindoy started out as barrio Payabon of Manjuyod. In 1949, President Elpidio Quirino separated it as the Municipality of Bindoy. Hermenegildo “Bindoy” Teves Villanueva (1876-1941) was, at various times, governor of Negros Oriental, congressman of the First District, Labor Secretary of the Quezon cabinet, and senator of the Republic.

 from Dumaguete, Bindoy is known as the hub of the Negros Oriental I Electric Cooperative, which energizes the northern towns. Its principal produce are copra, rice and corn, sugar cane, mangoes; and quantities of bamboo, pandan and romblon, tikog, buri, maguey and abaca to support cottage industries.

Bindoy's Bulod flatstones are weighty export items, their quarrying makes for an interesting sight. Bindoy's mangroves salute nature conservationists, as do dainty Mantahaw Falls and limpid Mantahaw Lake.

The annual Libod-Sayaw sa Bindoy, with streetdancing based on folk dances, is a colorful highlight of the town fiesta.

Geography

Barangays
Bindoy is politically subdivided into 22 barangays.

Climate

Demographics

Economy

Notable people
Juanita Amatong (b. 1935) - former secretary of Department of Finance (2003 - 2005)

See also
 List of renamed cities and municipalities of the Philippines

References

External links
 [ Philippine Standard Geographic Code]
Philippine Census Information
Local Governance Performance Management System

Municipalities of Negros Oriental